The Uprooted: The Epic Story of the Great Migrations That Made the American People is book about European migrations into the United States by  Oscar Handlin. It won the Pulitzer Prize for History in 1952.

References 

1952 non-fiction books
American history books
American political books
Pulitzer Prize for History-winning works
University of Pennsylvania Press books